Vingtaine de Bas du Mont au Prêtre is one of the five vingtaines of St. Helier Parish on the Channel Island of Jersey.  With the Vingtaine du Rouge Bouillon this vingtaine forms District St. Helier Central which returns five Deputies to the States of Jersey.

The Roads Inspectors for this Vingtaine are Mr. Paul Huelin and Mr. Daren O'Toole.

Gallery

References

Bas du Mont au Pretre
Saint Helier
Jersey articles needing attention